Georges Buchard (21 December 1893 – 22 January 1987) was a French fencer. He won medals in the épée competition at four Olympic Games.

References

External links
 

1893 births
1987 deaths
People from Harfleur
French male épée fencers
Olympic fencers of France
Fencers at the 1924 Summer Olympics
Fencers at the 1928 Summer Olympics
Fencers at the 1932 Summer Olympics
Fencers at the 1936 Summer Olympics
Olympic gold medalists for France
Olympic silver medalists for France
Olympic bronze medalists for France
Olympic medalists in fencing
Medalists at the 1924 Summer Olympics
Medalists at the 1928 Summer Olympics
Medalists at the 1932 Summer Olympics
Medalists at the 1936 Summer Olympics
Sportspeople from Seine-Maritime
20th-century French people